George Clive DL JP (October 1805 – 8 June 1880) was a British barrister, magistrate and Liberal politician.

Background and education
A member of the Clive (now Herbert) family headed by the Earl of Powis, George Clive was a younger son of Edward Clive and great-grandson of Reverend Benjamin Clive, uncle of Robert Clive, 1st Baron Clive ("Clive of India"). His mother was the Hon. Harriett, daughter of Andrew Archer, 2nd Baron Archer. He was educated at Harrow and Brasenose College, Oxford, and was called to the Bar, Lincoln's Inn, in 1830.

Legal career
Clive was appointed a Revising Barrister for Droitwich before 1837 and became a Police Magistrate of London between 1839 and 1847. Between 1847 and 1857 he was a Judge of Southwark. From 1857 to 1870 he was a Recorder of Wokingham.

Political career
Clive entered Parliament for Hereford in 1857, a seat he held until 1868 and again between 1874 and 1880. He served under Lord Palmerston as Under-Secretary of State for the Home Department from 1859 to 1862.

Family
Clive married Ann Sybella Martha, daughter of Sir Thomas Harvie Farquhar, 2nd Baronet, in 1835. They had several children, including General Edward Clive, father of Sir Sidney Clive, and Kathleen Mary. He died on 8 June 1880, aged 74. His wife remained a widow until her death in February 1907.

References

External links 
 

1805 births
1880 deaths
People educated at Harrow School
Alumni of Brasenose College, Oxford
Liberal Party (UK) MPs for English constituencies
UK MPs 1857–1859
UK MPs 1859–1865
UK MPs 1874–1880